Ernst Hermann August Theodor Busse (15 December 1897 – 21 October 1986) was a German officer during World War I and World War II.

Early life and career 
Busse, a native of Frankfurt (Oder), joined the Imperial German Army as an officer cadet in 1915 and was commissioned in February 1917. He also won the Knight's Cross with Swords of the Hohenzollern Order. After the armistice, he was accepted as one of 2,000 officers into the new Reichswehr in which he steadily rose in rank.

World War II
Busse was a General Staff officer in April 1939 and prepared a training program that was approved by the Chief of the General Staff in August and covered a period from 1 October 1939 to 30 September 1940. Between 1940 and 1942, he served as the Chief of Operations to General (later Field Marshal) Erich von Manstein in the 11th Army on the Eastern Front. He remained serving on von Manstein's staff from 1942 to 1943 as Chief of Operations of Army Group Don and then from 1943 to 1944 he was Chief of Staff of Army Group South, both on the Eastern Front. Serving with Army Group South, he was awarded the Knight's Cross of the Iron Cross on 30 January 1944. He spent a short time in reserve and was then appointed General Officer Commanding German 121st Infantry Division. In July 1944, he commanded I Army Corps.

While Busse took command of the 9th Army on 21 January 1945, his appointment was never confirmed. It would appear that it was customary for commanders of formations of the status of an Army and higher to be on six months probation before their final appointments as Commanders-in-Chief. Germany surrendered unconditionally before Busse's probationary period had expired.

During the last five months of the war, Busse commanded the 9th Army, which had become part of Army Group Vistula. As the Soviets continued to advance into Germany, he fought to protect the German capital. Specifically, Busse commanded the 9th Army during the Battle of Seelow Heights and the Battle of the Oder-Neisse. In April 1945, during the Battle of Berlin, Busse's Ninth Army was cut off from the armies on its flanks and almost encircled by Soviet Forces. General Gotthard Heinrici tried to convince Busse to withdraw several times, but Busse refused even to consider withdrawal unless a specific command arrived from the Führer. Eventually Busse's Ninth Army was driven into a pocket in the Spree Forest south of the Seelow Heights and west of Frankfurt, where it became fully encircled by two prongs of the massive Soviet assault on Berlin. In the ever-shrinking pocket, Busse's forces were all but annihilated in what is known as the Battle of Halbe, but remnants ultimately managed to break through to the west to link up with General Walther Wenck’s 12th Army south of Beelitz and then to withdraw west to the Elbe, cross the partially-destroyed bridge at Tangermünde and surrender to American forces between May 4 and 7.

Postwar
Between 1945 and 1948, Busse was a prisoner-of-war. After the war Busse was West Germany's director of civil defense, and he wrote and edited a number of works on the military history of World War II.

Awards and decorations

 Ehrenkreuz für Frontkämpfer on the 5th of December 1934

 Clasp to the Iron Cross
 2nd Class on 27 May 1940
 1st Class on 30 May 1940

 German Cross in Gold on 24 May 1942 as Oberst im Generalstab in AOK 11
 Knight's Cross of the Iron Cross (N 2611) on 30 January 1944 as Generalleutnant and Chief of the Generalstab of Heeresgruppe Süd
 Knight Commander's Cross of the Order of Merit of the Federal Republic of Germany (25 January 1966)

Books by Busse 

 "Kursk: The German View" by Steven H. Newton. The first part of the book goes to a new translation of a study of Operation Citadel (the great tank battle of Kursk) edited by General Theodor Busse, which offers the perspectives of key tank, infantry, and air commanders.

References

Citations

Bibliography

 
 
 

1897 births
1986 deaths
People from Frankfurt (Oder)
People from the Province of Brandenburg
German Army generals of World War II
Generals of Infantry (Wehrmacht)
German Army personnel of World War I
Prussian Army personnel
Recipients of the Gold German Cross
Recipients of the Knight's Cross of the Iron Cross
Knights Commander of the Order of Merit of the Federal Republic of Germany
Battle of Berlin
Recipients of the clasp to the Iron Cross, 1st class
Reichswehr personnel
Military personnel from Brandenburg